The Ischigualasto-Villa Unión Basin is a small sedimentary basin located in the Argentine Northwest, Argentina. It is located in the southwestern part of La Rioja Province and the northeastern part of San Juan Province. The basin borders the Sierras Pampeanas in the east, the western boundary of the basin is formed by the Valle Fértil Fault, bordering the Precordillera, and it is bound in the southeast by the El Alto Fault, separating the basin from the Marayes-El Carrizal Basin.

The basin started forming in the Late Permian, with the break-up of Pangea, when extensional tectonics, including rifting, formed several basins in Gondwana; present-day South America, Africa, Antarctica, India and Australia. The Cenozoic evolution of the basin is mainly influenced by the Andean orogeny, producing folding and faulting in the basin.

The basin is of paleontological significance as it hosts several fossiliferous stratigraphic units providing many fossils of early dinosaurs, synapsids, turtles, mammals, the earliest crocodylomorphs, fish, amphibians and flora, as well as ichnofossils. The Ischigualasto Provincial Park and Talampaya National Park in the basin were designated UNESCO World Heritage Sites in 2000.

Description 
The Ischigualasto-Villa Unión was recognized as a sedimentary basin by Stipanicic and Bonaparte in 1979. The basin stretches across a small area in northeastern San Juan Province and southwestern La Rioja Province in northwestern Argentina. The basin is bound by the Valle Fértil Fault to the west, separating the basin from the Precordillera, and the El Alto Fault in the southeast, forming the boundary with the Marayes-El Carrizal Basin. To the northeast, the basin ranges to the Sierras Pampeanas.

The area of the basin is sparsely populated, with Villa Unión in the north of the basin. The Talampaya and Chañares Rivers cross the basin.

Stratigraphy 
The stratigraphy of the Ischigualasto-Villa Unión Basin contains sediments of the Triassic. The earliest deposition occurred in the Early Triassic (Olenekian) with the redbeds of the Talampaya and Tarjados Formations. This sequence is separated from the overlying Agua de la Peña Group by a regional unconformity.

Paleontological significance 
The Ischigualasto-Villa Unión Basin is renowned for hosting the Triassic-age lagerstätten of the Chañares and Ischigualasto formations. These units have produced numerous fossils of synapsids and reptiles, including the earliest known dinosaurs. Other fossiliferous units within the basin have preserved fish, insects, flora, and ichnofossils. The basin represents one of three locations in Argentina where Triassic trackways were found, together with the Cuyo Basin to the south and Los Menucos Basin in Río Negro Province.

Many of the earliest known crocodylomorphs come from the Ischigulasto-Villa Unión Basin. In the Los Colorados Formation, the crocodylomorphs Hemiprotosuchus leali and Coloradisuchus abelini were found.

See also 
 Paraná Basin, containing many Triassic fossiliferous formations in southeastern Brazil and northwestern Argentina
 Cuyo Basin, of northwestern Argentina
 Salta Basin, of northwestern Argentina
 Neuquén Basin, of western Argentina
 Cañadón Asfalto Basin, of central-southern Argentina

References

Bibliography 
General
 
 
 
 
  
 
 
 

Paleontology
 
 

Chañares Formation
 
 

Los Colorados Formation
 
 
 
 
 

Los Rastros Formation

Further reading 

 
 
 

 
Sedimentary basins of Argentina
Rift basins
Mesozoic rifts and grabens
Geology of La Rioja Province, Argentina
Geology of San Juan Province, Argentina
Quechuan languages